Gates is a census-designated place in the town of Gates, Monroe County, New York, United States. As of the 2010 census, it had a population of 4,910, out of 28,400 in the entire town of Gates.

The CDP is in central Monroe County, in the eastern part of the town of Gates. It is bordered to the east by the city of Rochester and to the north by the North Gates CDP. Interstate 490 passes through the center of the Gates CDP and intersects Interstate 390 in the eastern part of the CDP. New York State Route 33 (Buffalo Road) forms the southern edge of the community, and State Route 31 (Lyell Avenue) forms part of the northern edge.

The hamlet of Gates Center occupies the southern half of the CDP (south of I-490), and Gates Chili High School is in the western part of the CDP.

Demographics

References 

Census-designated places in Monroe County, New York
Census-designated places in New York (state)